Old Stone House Library, also known as the Shipman-Swift House, is a historic library building located at Fort Ann, Washington County, New York. It was built about 1825, as a private dwelling and converted for use as a library in 1922.  It is a two-story, five bay, Potsdam sandstone building with a small frame rear ell.  The building has Federal and Greek Revival style design elements.  The building was purchased and donated to the community by George Owen Knapp (1855-1945).

It was added to the National Register of Historic Places in 2012.

References

Libraries on the National Register of Historic Places in New York (state)
Federal architecture in New York (state)
Greek Revival architecture in New York (state)
Houses completed in 1825
Buildings and structures in Washington County, New York
National Register of Historic Places in Washington County, New York
Underground Railroad in New York (state)